Wrights Township is one of thirteen townships in Greene County, Illinois, USA.  As of the 2010 census, its population was 314 and it contained 139 housing units.

Geography

Unincorporated towns
 Wrights at 
(This list is based on USGS data and may include former settlements.)

Cemeteries
The township contains Hickory Grove Cemetery.

Demographics

School districts
 Carrollton Community Unit School District 1
 Greenfield Community Unit School District 10
 North Greene Unit School District 3

Political districts
 Illinois' 17th congressional district
 State House District 97
 State Senate District 49

References
 
 United States Census Bureau 2007 TIGER/Line Shapefiles
 United States National Atlas

External links
 City-Data.com
 Illinois State Archives

Townships in Greene County, Illinois
Townships in Illinois